Can John Braund Cure Cancer? is a 1948 Australian documentary directed by Ken G. Hall about John Braund, a man who claimed he could cure cancer.

Braund was a highly controversial character at the time and the film was much publicised. There was considerable controversy over whether Braund should have been allowed to have such a public forum. Braund was later declared to be a fraud.

References

External links
Copy of film at British Pathe
Can John Braund Cure Cancer? at National Film and Sound Archive

1948 films
1948 documentary films
Australian documentary films
Cancer in Australia
Documentary films about cancer
Australian black-and-white films
1940s English-language films